Laurence Rossignol (born 22 December 1957) is a French politician of the Socialist Party (PS) who has served as a member of the French Senate from 2011 to 2014 and again since 2017, representing Oise. From 2014 to 2017, she served as Secretary of State for the Family, Senior Citizens and Autonomy in the governments of Prime Ministers Manuel Valls and Bernard Cazeneuve.

Political career
From 2014 to 2017, Rossignol served as State Secretary under the leadership of Minister of Health Marisol Touraine. During her time in office, she established the Agency for the Recovery of Unpaid Alimonies (ARIPA) to ensure the recovery of outstanding child support. 

In the Socialist Party's presidential primaries, Rossignol endorsed Valls as the party's candidate for the 2017 French presidential election. At the Aubervilliers Congress in 2017, she also supported Luc Carvounas’ candidacy to lead the PS. 

In 2017, Rossignol was a candidate for the leadership of the Socialist group in the Senate, against Martial Bourquin and incumbent Didier Guillaume; Guillaume was eventually re-elected. 

Ahead of the 2022 presidential election, Rossignol endorsed Anne Hidalgo as the party’s candidate to replace incumbent Emmanuel Macron.

Political positions
In 2015, Rossignol defended the government's policy of testing the bones of foreign minors to determine their age.

In 2016, Rossignol caused controversy when she compared Islamic women who chose to wear veils to "negroes who were for slavery". She was later reported to have apologized for the use of the word negro but stood by her comparison of veil wearing to slavery.

References

1957 births
Living people
People from La Garenne-Colombes
Politicians from Île-de-France
Socialist Party (France) politicians
University of Burgundy alumni
Pantheon-Sorbonne University alumni
French Senators of the Fifth Republic
Government ministers of France
Women members of the Senate (France)
21st-century French women politicians
Women government ministers of France
Senators of Oise